Healdsburg Municipal Airport  is three miles (4.8 km) northwest of Healdsburg, serving Sonoma County, California, United States.

Facilities
The airport covers 50 acres; its single runway, 13/31, is 2,707 x 60 ft (825 x 18 m), asphalt.

See also
List of airports in the San Francisco Bay Area

References

External links

Healdsburg, California
Airports in Sonoma County, California